Alexander Comfort (10 February 1920 – 26 March 2000) was a British scientist and physician known best for his nonfiction sex manual, The Joy of Sex (1972). He was an author of both fiction and nonfiction, as well as a gerontologist, anarchist, pacifist, and conscientious objector.

Early life and education
Comfort was educated at Highgate School in London. While he was a student there he tried to develop an improved compound of gunpowder. During his experiments he inadvertently blew up his left hand, of which only the thumb remained. Later he claimed that his left hand proved "very useful for performing uterine inversions".

Comfort had a passion for molluscs, and joined the Conchological Society of Great Britain & Ireland when he was eighteen years old. He made many contributions to the literature.

He matriculated at Trinity College, Cambridge and studied medicine, qualifying in 1944 with the conjoint diplomas of Licentiate of the Royal College of Physicians (LRCP) London, Member of the Royal College of Surgeons (MRCS) England, and Bachelor of Medicine and Bachelor of Surgery or MB BChir.

Life and work

Comfort served as a house physician at the London Hospital and later became a lecturer in physiology at the London Hospital Medical College. During 1945 he obtained the Conjoint Board's Diploma in Child Health, and progressed to a PhD in 1950 and a DSc of University College, London in 1963.

A pacifist, Comfort considered himself "an aggressive anti-militarist", and he believed that pacifism rested "solely upon the historical theory of anarchism". During World War Two, Comfort wrote a letter to the Tribune (2 April 1943) denouncing the Allied bombing of civilians:

The bombardment of Europe is not the work of soldiers nor of responsible statesmen. It is the work of bloodthirsty fools. ... Night after night those Europeans who risk their liberty to listen can hear the emetic threatenings and boastings of bloody-minded and reactionary civilians. They contrast the alacrity and satisfaction which attend each contemptible operation with the subterfuge and sloth which we have displayed in such tasks of constructive policy as the admission to sanctuary of the Jewish refugees.

In a letter to Horizon in 1942 Comfort claimed that a Nazi victory over the United Kingdom would lead to a literary renaissance, for which he was fiercely criticised by George Orwell in the Partisan Review. Comfort was an active member of the Peace Pledge Union (PPU) and Campaign for Nuclear Disarmament, and a conscientious objector in World War II. In 1951 Comfort was a signatory of the Authors' World Peace Appeal, but later resigned from its committee, claiming the AWPA had become dominated by Soviet sympathisers. Later in the decade he actively endorsed both the Direct Action Committee against Nuclear War, 1957, and the Committee of 100, 1960. Comfort was imprisoned for a month, with Bertrand Russell and other leading members of the Committee of 100, for refusing to be bound not to continue organising the Parliament Square/Trafalgar Square protest of 17 September 1961.

Among the publications by Comfort concerning anarchism are Peace and Disobedience (1946), one of many pamphlets he wrote for Peace News and PPU, and Authority and Delinquency in the Modern State (1950). He exchanged public correspondence with George Orwell defending pacifism in the open letter/poem, "Letter to an American Visitor", under the pseudonym "Obadiah Hornbrooke".

Comfort's book The Joy of Sex (1972) earned him worldwide fame and $3 million. But he was unhappy about becoming known as "Dr. Sex" and having his other works given little attention.

Comfort devoted much of the 1950s and 1960s to studying the biology of ageing (biogerontology) and popularised the subject. During 1969 he suggested that life expectancy (not simply maximum life span) could be extended to 120 years of age within the next 20 years. Although Comfort believed that ageing could be postponed, he did not believe that it could be eliminated, and he did not write about rejuvenation.

In 1989 Comfort made an extended appearance on the television discussion programme After Dark, alongside, among others, Ian McColl and David Widgery.

One of Comfort's final letters was to The Guardian in 1989, protesting against the Thatcher government's introduction of the poll tax.

Personal life

The Joy of Sex made Comfort known internationally as "Dr. Sex" and soon thereafter he and his wife of thirty years divorced. A few months later, during 1973, Comfort married his mistress (and ex-wife's best friend) Jane Henderson, with whom he had been having an affair for more than a decade.The Center for the Study of Democratic Institutions, a liberal research institute, offered Comfort a job, and so, during 1973, the couple relocated to Santa Barbara, California, where it was located.

They frequented the Sandstone Retreat, a clothing-optional community in California espousing "open sexuality", or swinging. In his 1981 nonfiction publication concerning sexuality in America, Thy Neighbor's Wife, Gay Talese noted, "Often the nude biologist Dr. Alex Comfort, brandishing a cigar, traipsed through the room between the prone bodies with the professional air of a lepidopterist strolling through the fields waving a butterfly net".

Jane Henderson, however, eventually became tired of the "open love" community and Comfort became involved in lawsuits with his employer concerning a claimed breach of contract. During 1985, the couple returned to England, where they lived the remainder of their lives in Kent.

During 1991, Comfort suffered a severe cerebral haemorrhage, after which his son from his first marriage acted as his caretaker and business manager. His second wife Jane Henderson died soon after the haemorrhage. He died on 26 March 2000; he was eighty years old.

Partial bibliography

See also
 List of peace activists

References

External links
 AlexComfort.net – full text of 'Authority and Delinquency' and 'I and That: Notes on the Biology of Religion'
 Biography of Alex Comfort – with attention to his anarchist politics
 See the Alex Comfort Page in the Anarchist Encyclopedia
 Guardian obituary
 Comfort Papers at University College London

1920 births
2000 deaths
20th-century British male writers
20th-century British non-fiction writers
20th-century British zoologists
Alumni of University College London
Anarchist writers
Anarcho-pacifists
Biogerontologists
British anarchists
British conscientious objectors
British male non-fiction writers
British pacifists
British scientists
Conchologists
Free love advocates
Life extensionists
People educated at Highgate School